Jacqueline Bird (née Macpherson, born 31 July 1962) is a Scottish journalist and broadcaster, best known as a former anchor of the BBC Scotland national news programme Reporting Scotland.

Early life 
Jacqueline Macpherson was born on 31 July 1962 in Bellshill, North Lanarkshire, the daughter of Linda and Ronnie Macpherson. Bird attended Earnock High School in Hamilton.

Career

Bird was 17 when she started work for DC Thomson in Dundee working on teenage magazines and eventually became the pop editor at Jackie magazine. Subsequently, she worked as a broadcast journalist on Radio Clyde's news team and then as a food critic for the Glasgow Evening Times. After working as a reporter for The Sun newspaper, Bird joined Television South in Maidstone as a reporter and presenter for the South East edition of regional news programme Coast to Coast.

Bird left TVS to join BBC Scotland, making her debut as a main presenter of Reporting Scotland on Monday 16 October 1989. She has also been a main presenter of key event programming for BBC Scotland, including Hogmanay Live and the Scottish Children in Need opt-outs.

Bird is also a newspaper columnist and has written and produced comedy series The Lewis Lectures and Having it All for BBC Radio Scotland.

On 13 June 2012, she was awarded the honorary degree of Doctor of Letters (D Litt) in a graduation ceremony at the University of Glasgow.

In October 2014, Bird celebrated 25 years of working on Reporting Scotland, as the programme's longest serving presenter.

On 11 April 2019, BBC Scotland announced Bird had left Reporting Scotland after nearly 30 years as a main presenter to concentrate on other projects. Bird presented her final programme the previous evening, without announcing her departure.

Other work
Bird has also toured with  Echo & the Bunnymen and worked with Paul Weller.

In November 2016, she appeared as herself in the episode, "Down and Out" in series 7 of Scottish sitcom Still Game. In 2018, Bird made a brief cameo appearance in the zombie Christmas musical film Anna and the Apocalypse.

Personal life
Bird met Bob Bird, a newspaper editor, at The Sun in Glasgow. They married and moved to London, where they had their two children, Claudia and Jacob. In 2006, the couple divorced and the following year she married Robin Weir, an investment manager, at Crutherland House Hotel in East Kilbride, Lanarkshire.

In 2012 Bird had sections of her small and large intestine removed after suffering a rare bowel condition.

References

External links
/pressoffice

1962 births
BBC Scotland newsreaders and journalists
Living people
People from Bellshill
British women television journalists
British women radio presenters